The Carey Range is a mountain range, about  long and  wide with peaks rising to , between Mosby Glacier and Fenton Glacier in southeast Palmer Land. The range was mapped by the United States Geological Survey from U.S. Navy aerial photographs, 1966–69. In association with the names of continental drift scientists grouped in this area, it was named by the Advisory Committee on Antarctic Names after Samuel W. Carey, Australian geologist; Professor of Geology, University of Tasmania, 1946–1970.

Features
Sverdrup Nunataks

References 

Mountain ranges of Palmer Land